The yellow-browed antbird (Hypocnemis hypoxantha) is a species of bird in the antbird family Thamnophilidae. It is found in Brazil, Colombia, Ecuador, and Peru. Its natural habitat is subtropical or tropical moist lowland forests.

The yellow-browed antbird was described by the English zoologist Philip Sclater in 1869 and given its current binomial name Hypocnemis hypoxantha. The specific epithet combines the Ancient Greek hupo meaning "beneath" and xanthos meaning "yellow".

Two subspecies are recognised:
 H. h. hypoxantha Sclater, PL, 1869 – southeast Colombia to east Ecuador, central Peru and west Amazonian Brazil
 H. h. ochraceiventris Chapman, 1921 – southeast Amazonian Brazil

References

Further reading

yellow-browed antbird
Birds of the Amazon Basin
Birds of the Colombian Amazon
Birds of the Ecuadorian Amazon
Birds of the Peruvian Amazon
yellow-browed antbird
yellow-browed antbird
Taxonomy articles created by Polbot